Bishop's Quay is a hamlet in south-west Cornwall, England, United Kingdom. It is in the civil parish of St. Martin-in-Meneage.  It is situated on the south bank of the tidal Mawgan Creek at its confluence with the Helford River five miles (8 km) east of Helston. The Cornish Seal Sanctuary at Gweek is half-a-mile away on the north bank of the Helford River.

Notes

Hamlets in Cornwall